Ricatus was a possible 11th-century king of Cornwall, although recent scholarship has cast doubt on his existence. If he existed, Ricatus may have been the penultimate Cornish king.

Penzance Market Cross 
The primary evidence for a king of this name is the medieval Penzance Market Cross which now stands in the grounds of Penlee House in Penzance, Cornwall, England, UK. R. A. Stewart Macalister in his Corpus Inscriptionum Insularum Celticarum published in 1949 stated that an inscription in a panel on the side of the cross read REGIS RICATI CRUX, translating to "Cross of King Ricatus".

The cross dates to around 1050 AD, or as early as 1007. Writing about it in 1986, Charles Thomas said that because of this late date, Ricatus could have been little more than a local ruler around Land's End. However, Thomas describes the cross in greater detail in his later book on post Roman inscriptions in Western Britain, And Shall These Mute Stones Speak? (1994). In this work, he describes the inscription as having "lettering so grotesque as to be unintelligible", and he relegates Macalister's reading to a footnote, where he says that it "is impossible to follow", adding that "an eleventh-century Cornish king would need a lot of explaining." Philip Payton, in his Cornwall: A History (2004) acknowledges this, but says there was "perhaps a semblance, an echo, an assertion of Cornish kingly independence" in the far west of Cornwall less than a century before the Norman Conquest.

In 1998 Thomas examined the cross again in detail and stated that the inscription actually reads RECGISI CRUX or RAEGISI CRUX meaning "the cross of Recgisi or Raegisi", an Old English personal name, unrecorded elsewhere, which Thomas ascribes to the donor or benefactor of the land (a graveyard) on which the cross was originally erected.

Possible mentions 
The 11th/12th century Welsh tale Culhwch and Olwen refers to "Gormant the son of Ricca", saying that he was "Arthur's brother by his mother's side; the Penhynev of Cornwall was his father", a parallel to later stories of Gorlois of Cornwall. This Ricca may possibly refer to Ricatus; it also occurs as a variant name for Rhitta Gawr, a giant of Welsh folklore. The title  or  means 'chief elder', and the first triad of Peniarth 54 uses the same title for Caradawg Vreichvras as Arthur's chief elder at Celliwig, Cornwall.

The sixteenth-century Cornish language drama Beunans Meriasek ('The Life of St Meriasek') at lines 2463–65 mentions four Cornish kings. The second is called Pygys, which may be a misreading for an earlier Rygys, the Cornish form of Ricatus.

Legacy 
In 1980 Mullion School, Mullion, Cornwall named one of its houses, Ricat, after King Ricatus.

See also

 Kingdom of Cornwall
 Cornovii (Cornish)

References

Monarchs of Cornwall
Market crosses in England
11th-century English monarchs